Gary Wheeler may refer to:

 Gary Wheeler (rugby league) (born 1989), English rugby league player
 Gary Wheeler (filmmaker), American film producer
 Gary Wheeler (politician) (1938–2010), mayor of Moncton, 1974–1979

See also
 Wheeler (surname)